TAP Express (TAP standing for Transportes Aéreos Portugueses) is a Portuguese regional airline brand name for TAP Air Portugal which operates short and medium-haul routes. TAP Air Portugal's lone wholly owned regional airline, Portugália Airlines, operates under the TAP Express banner. White Airways, an airline owned by Omni Aviation, also operates regular flights for TAP Express using 6 ATR 72 turboprops. Its head office is on the grounds of Lisbon Portela Airport in Lisbon.

History 
On 14 January 2016, TAP Portugal announced that PGA Portugália Airlines, its regional subsidiary, would be rebranded as TAP Express as of 27 March 2016, as part of the restructuring measures within the group, even though the company still operates as a wholly owned company of TAP Air Portugal. Mainline carriers often use regional airlines to operate services in order to increase frequency, serve routes that would not sustain larger aircraft, or for other competitive reasons.

Also on 14 January 2016, TAP Air Portugal also announced that the entire Portugália fleet consisting of Fokker 100 and Embraer ERJ-145 would be replaced by July 2016 with new Embraer 190 and ATR 72-600 aircraft (the latter operated by White Airways) which received a livery similar to that of TAP Portugal.

Destinations

Fleet 

As of November 2022, the TAP Express fleet consists of the following aircraft:

References

External links

TAP Air Portugal website

Airlines established in 1988
Airlines of Portugal
Companies based in Lisbon
European Regions Airline Association
Portuguese brands
Star Alliance affiliate members
TAP Air Portugal
Portuguese companies established in 1988